Fire Music is the fifth album by Gallon Drunk, released on March 4, 2002 through Sweet Nothing Records.

Track listing

Personnel 
Gallon Drunk
Jeremy Cottingham – bass guitar, guitar, percussion
Terry Edwards – baritone saxophone, soprano saxophone, muted trumpet
James Johnston – vocals, guitar, bass guitar, autoharp, piano, organ, harpsichord, harmonica, tambourine, percussion
Ian White – drums, bongos, congas, maracas, tambourine, percussion, engineering, mixing, recording
Production and additional personnel
Shaun Joseph – mastering
Ed Rose – production, engineering, mixing, recording

References

External links 
 

2002 albums
Albums produced by Ed Rose
Gallon Drunk albums